Operation Eland, also known as the Nyadzonya Raid, was a military operation carried out by operatives of the Rhodesian Selous Scouts at Nyadzonya in Mozambique on 9 August 1976. The Rhodesians initially claimed 300 ZANLA and 30 FAM (Armed Forces of Mozambique) soldiers were killed and claimed documentation captured after the event suggested that more than 1,028 were killed, while ZANLA and Amnesty International claimed the people killed were unarmed refugees.

The raid had adverse political and diplomatic consequences for Rhodesia. In response to the attack, the South African government ended its covert military assistance for Rhodesia, reduced the supply of oil and munitions, and began to pressure the Rhodesian government to accept a transition to black majority rule. The Rhodesian Prime Minister Ian Smith agreed to this in principle in September 1976.

Background
Throughout the winter of 1976, the Rhodesian government believed it had identified a major ZANLA staging and training camp located in Mozambique and identified as the Nyadzonya Base. This camp appeared to be the main insurgent and logistics base for operations conducted in the THRASHER operational area. Both aerial reconnaissance and captured guerrillas had confirmed that the camp contained a large hospital, and approximately 5,000 ZANLA personnel.

This constituted the largest center of insurgent activity discovered to this point in the war. As a result, a combined force was organised to include members of the RLI, RAC, SAS, Selous Scouts, and members selected from the Territorial Units.

The historians Paul L. Moorcraft and Peter McLaughlin wrote in 1982 that "although the camp did contain trained guerrillas and young recruits, many of its inhabitants were old people, women and young children who had fled from Rhodesia as refugees". They further wrote in 2008 that "although nearly all the personnel in the camp were unarmed, many were trained guerillas or undergoing instruction" A 1994 Amnesty International publication stated that the camp at Nyadzonya housed refugees, and that a soldier who participated in the raid later stated: "We were told that Nyadzonia was a camp containing several thousand unarmed refugees who could be recruited to join the guerrillas. It would be easier if we went in and wiped them out while they were unarmed and before they were trained rather than waiting for the possibility of them being trained and sent back armed into Rhodesia".

The success of the "Flying-Column Attack" during the Mapai raid served as the basis for the tactics devised for a strike against the ZANLA forces at Nyadzonya. Once again, air support would be provided for serious medevacs on the objectives, and close air support would be available in the event of a dire emergency. The planning included a table model of the camp and its surroundings. Captured insurgents provided information concerning the defenses, positions of the armories, hospital, living quarters, the daily routine, and a general outline of the escape drills of the ZANLA insurgents. The "Flying-Column" consisted of 14 vehicles and 85 men. There were only two types of vehicles on the operation: 10 Unimog and 4 Ferret armoured cars. The transport vehicles were armed with a wide assortment of weapons: 20mm aircraft cannons, medium and light machine guns, and a captured Soviet 12.7 mm heavy machine gun. The men were dressed in captured Mozambique FRELIMO uniforms with their distinctive caps (the white members of the force wore black ski-masks). The vehicles were painted using the FRELIMO colors, and Rhodesian Intelligence had provided genuine FRELIMO registration numbers for the vehicle license plates.

Operation
On 5 August 1976, a group of 60 ZANLA guerrillas entered Rhodesia from Mozambique and attacked a military base at Ruda, near Umtali. Four days later, guerrillas killed four soldiers in a mortar attack, and another died in a follow-up operation. The local white population demanded that action be taken.

The attacking column consisted of four Ferret armoured cars and seven armoured Unimogs, two of which were armed with 20mm Hispano cannons scavenged from obsolete aircraft. The vehicles were disguised to make them look like they belonged to FRELIMO, while the men who were mostly black disguised themselves in FRELIMO uniforms. Amongst the soldiers was a turned former ZANLA commander by the name of Morrison Nyathi, who led the attackers to the camp.

The attacking party was able to bluff its way past the gate guards and drive into the very heart of the camp. Nyathi blew a whistle, which was the emergency signal for the guerrillas to muster on the parade ground; The Rhodesian forces then killed large numbers of people in the camp. According to Moorcraft and McLaughlin, the camp was a ZANLA base containing 5,000 personnel.

The bridge over the Pungwe River was a key strategic point that the assault team had to fight their way through on their return journey to Rhodesia. The bridge was successfully assaulted, and then charges laid under enemy fire to destroy it, and thereby to cover the escape. As they laid the charges under the bridge, they fired at an approaching car, killing a Catholic priest and a boy, while badly injuring a Cluny sister and the vicar-general of the Diocese of Tete, Father Domingos Ferrão.

Aftermath
ZANLA and Amnesty International claimed that the base was a refugee camp, and that the assault was the worst atrocity of the war. The head of the Selous Scouts claimed that captured ZANLA documents showed that the people killed in the raid were either trained guerrillas or were undergoing guerrilla instruction and training. Paul L. Moorcraft and Peter McLaughlin wrote in 1982, that "although the camp did contain trained guerrillas and young recruits, many of its inhabitants were old people, women and young children who had fled from Rhodesia as refugees". They further wrote in 2010, that "although nearly all the personnel in the camp were unarmed, many were trained guerillas or undergoing instruction" and that documents captured from ZANLA, revealed more than 1,028 were killed in the operation. A 1994 Amnesty International publication described the operation as a massacre and stated that the camp at Nyadzonya housed refugees, and that a soldier who participated in the raid later stated: "We were told that Nyadzonia was a camp containing several thousand unarmed refugees who could be recruited to join the guerrillas. It would be easier if we went in and wiped them out while they were unarmed and before they were trained rather than waiting for the possibility of them being trained and sent back armed into Rhodesia". According to Amnesty International, 1,000 people were killed and the operation was "a gross human rights violation and a war crime"..

Operation Eland led to an important breach between the Rhodesian and South African governments. The South African Prime Minister John Vorster had warned his Rhodesian counterpart Ian Smith against expanding the conflict. Vorster had not been notified about Operation Eland, and reacted by withdrawing the military support that his government was providing to Rhodesia covertly through Operation Polo; this led to the loss of half the Rhodesian Air Force's helicopter pilots as well as maintenance personnel and liaison officers. Vorster also reduced the supply of oil and munitions to Rhodesia and his foreign minister announced that South Africa would now support a transition to black majority rule in Rhodesia. In response to this pressure, Smith announced on 24 September 1976 that he now agreed to the principle of majority rule, but did not define what he meant by this.

References

Citations

Works consulted

Notes

See also
Battle of Cassinga
Operation Dingo

1976 in Rhodesia
1976 in Mozambique
Eland
Massacres in Mozambique
August 1976 events in Africa